IHS may refer to:

Religious
 Christogram IHS or ΙΗΣ, a monogram symbolizing Jesus Christ
 In hoc signo, used by Roman emperor Constantine the Great

Organizations
 Indian Health Service, an operating division of the US Department of Health and Human Services
 Dictaphone company division for healthcare dictating applications
 IHS Markit, a data publishing company (Information Handling Services) that originated in 1959, and has since merged with Markit.

Institutes
 Institute for Housing and Urban Development Studies, an international institute
 Institute for Humane Studies, a US educational organization
 Institute for Humanist Studies, a think tank based in Washington, DC

Societies
 Indiana Historical Society, a historical society in the US
 International Headache Society, organisation for professionals helping people affected by headache
 International Horn Society, organization dedicated to horn-players
 Ipswich Historical Society, in Ipswich, Massachusetts, US

Schools
 Independence High School (Arizona), US
 Irondequoit High School, Irondequoit, New York, US
 Issaquah High School, Issaquah, Washington, US
 The Indian High School, Dubai, United Arab Emirates
 Interlake High School, Bellevue, Washington, US
 Ithaca High School, Ithaca, New York, US

Technology
 Intensity, hue, saturation, in the HSL color space
 IBM HTTP Server, a web server
 Integrated Heat Spreader, a heat spreader that serves as an interface between a chip and a heat sink

Other uses
 Integrated Household Survey, a survey comprising multiple surveys in the UK
 Ironclads: High Seas, a naval simulator computer game